Léonard Pétion Laroche (born 6 November 1918 in Jacmel) was a Haitian clergyman and bishop for the Roman Catholic Diocese of Hinche. He became ordained in 1943. He was appointed bishop in 1982. He died in 2006.

References

20th-century Roman Catholic bishops in Haiti
1918 births
2006 deaths
People from Jacmel
Haitian Roman Catholic bishops
Roman Catholic bishops of Hinche